Die Landärztin (The Country Doctor) is a German television series.

See also
List of German television series

External links
 

German medical television series
Austrian medical television series
2005 German television series debuts
2013 German television series endings
2005 Austrian television series debuts
2013 Austrian television series endings
2000s Austrian television series
2010s Austrian television series
German-language television shows
Das Erste original programming